Tadatoshi (written:  or ) is a masculine Japanese given name. Notable people with the name include:

, Japanese field hockey player
, Japanese politician and activist
, Japanese daimyō
, Japanese daimyō
, Japanese footballer

Japanese masculine given names